Selwyn John Blackmore (born 6 September 1972) is a former New Zealand cricketer, who played 29 first-class matches for the Wellington Firebirds, in the State Championship. He also played for Hutt Valley in the Hawke Cup. He was born in Whangarei.

References

1972 births
Living people
New Zealand cricketers
Wellington cricketers
Cricketers from Whangārei